James Primrose Stark (7 March 1885 – 16 June 1929) was a British athlete. He competed at the 1908 Summer Olympics in London. He was born and died in Glasgow.

In the 100 metres, Stark won his first round heat with a time of 11.8 seconds to advance to the semifinals. There, he took third place in his race and was eliminated from further competition.

He took third place in his preliminary heat of the 200 metres, not advancing to the semifinals.

References

Sources
 Profile
 
 
 

1885 births
1929 deaths
British male sprinters
Olympic athletes of Great Britain
Athletes (track and field) at the 1908 Summer Olympics